Bridie Monds-Watson, better known by the stage name Soak, is a singer-songwriter from Derry, Northern Ireland. Soak's music has been described as 'a vivid portrait of teenage deep-thinking' by The Guardian. They released their debut studio album Before We Forgot How to Dream in May 2015. "Soak" is a phonetic portmanteau of "soul" and "folk".

Career 
In November 2014, they were revealed as one of the acts on the BBC Sound of 2015 long list. On 20 January 2015, they released their debut single, "Sea Creatures". They released their debut studio album Before We Forgot How to Dream on 29 May 2015, which won the Irish Choice Music Prize Album of the Year 2015 on 3 March 2016 at the annual awards ceremony held in Vicar Street, Dublin. On 25 January 2022, Soak announced that their third album If I Never Know You Like This Again would be released on 20 May and debuted the single "Last July".

Personal life 
Soak is non-binary, and uses they/them pronouns.

Discography

Albums

Singles 

 Guest appearances

Awards and nominations

References

External links 

 

Living people
Folk singers from Northern Ireland
Guitarists from Northern Ireland
Non-binary singers
Non-binary songwriters
Singer-songwriters from Northern Ireland
21st-century singers from Northern Ireland
Year of birth missing (living people)
LGBT songwriters from Northern Ireland
LGBT singers from Northern Ireland